The Wrecking Crew is a 2008 American documentary film directed by Denny Tedesco, son of guitarist Tommy Tedesco.  It covers the story of the Los Angeles–based group of session musicians known as the Wrecking Crew, famed for having played on numerous hit recordings throughout the 1960s and early 1970s.  The film premiered at the 2008 South by Southwest Film Festival.

Synopsis
Popular music of the 1960s was dominated by young bands like the Beach Boys, the Mamas & the Papas, Jan and Dean, and the Monkees.  Listening to rock and roll on jukeboxes and car radios created devoted fans of these groups, whose music communicated the optimism and sorrow of a generation contending with strong countercultural forces.

Record companies happily supplied the public with new songs and musical groups, all packaged with artistic photographs and biographical profiles. Left out of the story was an important historical fact: the bands, in some, but not all, cases, did not play the instruments heard on their records. Instead, the task of recording the perfect tempo, pitch, and timbre fell to a small group of accomplished session musicians.

The Wrecking Crew documents the work of studio players who recorded the tracks for such hits as "California Dreamin'", "These Boots Are Made for Walkin'", "Be My Baby", "The Beat Goes On", and "Good Vibrations".  Interviews with producers, engineers, and session musicians reveal the warmth and humor that allowed their collective talents to turn a simple chord chart into an international phenomenon.

Cast
The film cast included the following musicians and performers, in live appearance and archived footage

Production
Production began in June 1996 and was completed in February 2008.  The film played in film festivals in North America, and was the closing film at the Nashville Film Festival on April 24, 2008.  A Kickstarter campaign at the end of 2013 raised over three hundred thousand dollars to cover music licensing and final production costs.  The film opened in theaters across the United States on March 13, 2015.

Critical response
The Wrecking Crew has received many positive reviews from critics. Kenneth Turan of the Los Angeles Times wrote, "If the history of rock music means anything to you, you know the individuals in question could only be the Wrecking Crew, a legendary group of Los Angeles-based studio musicians, and though their story has taken decades to reach the screen, it has been worth the wait." Mark Feeney of The Boston Globe commented, "Think of The Wrecking Crew as 20 Feet from Stardom (2013) for instrumentalists, or a West Coast version of Standing in the Shadows of Motown (2002). There's a similar shared joy among the participants, a similar sense of discovery for the viewer, and, of course, a killer soundtrack." Film review aggregator Rotten Tomatoes reports that 95% of critics gave the film a positive review, based on seventy three reviews with a "Certified Fresh" rating and an average score of 7.13/10. The site's consensus states: "The Wrecking Crew may not achieve the greatness of the many classic songs its subjects helped bring to life, but it remains a heartfelt, overdue tribute to overshadowed brilliance."

Accolades
 Seattle International Film Festival: Audience Award (2008)
 International Documentary Association: Nomination for Alan Ett Music Documentary Award (2008)
 The Rome International Film Festival: Best American Documentary and Audience Award (2008)
 Anchorage International Film Festival: Audience Award (2008)
 Barbados International Film Festival: Best Documentary (2008)
 Savannah Film Festival: Standing Ovation Award (2008)
 Tallgrass Film Festival: Audience Award (2008)
 Idaho International Film Festival: Winner Best Documentary (2008)
 Buffalo Niagara Film Festival: Winner Audience Award (2008)
 Nashville Film Festival: Honorable Mention Impact of Music Award (2008)
 Rhode Island International Film Festival: First Place Documentary (2008)
 Connecticut Film Festival: Audience Award (2010)

References

External links
 
 
 
 
 Denny Tedesco Interview NAMM Oral History Library (2018)

2008 films
2008 documentary films
American documentary films
Rockumentaries
Documentary films about Los Angeles
Music of Los Angeles
Kickstarter-funded documentaries
2000s English-language films
2000s American films